The 2014 NCAA Division I women's volleyball tournament began on December 4 and concluded on December 20 at Chesapeake Energy Arena in Oklahoma City, Oklahoma. The tournament field was announced on November 30.

Penn State defeated BYU in the finals to win the school's 7th NCAA title.

Qualifying teams
The champions of the NCAA's 32 conferences qualify automatically. Twenty-two conferences hold tournaments, while the other ten award their automatic bid on the basis of being the league's regular-season champion. Those that do not hold tournaments are the American Athletic, Atlantic Coast, Big 12, Big Ten, Big West,  Ivy League, Mountain West, Pac-12, Southeastern and West Coast Conferences. The other 32 bids are apportioned on an at-large basis. Only the top 16 teams overall are seeded.

Records

Bracket
The first two rounds were held on campus sites (the home court of the seeded team). Regional semifinals and finals were held at pre-determined sites. In 2014, those sites were hosted by Iowa State, Louisville, Minnesota, and Washington. Unlike the NCAA basketball tournament, where teams cannot be placed into regionals that they host, the selectors in the volleyball tournament were required to place qualifying teams in their 'home' regionals, in order to reduce travel costs.

Ames Regional

Louisville Regional

Seattle Regional

Minneapolis Regional

Final Four

Final Four All-Tournament Team:

Record by conference

The columns R32, S16, E8, F4, CM, and NC respectively stand for the Round of 32, Sweet Sixteen, Elite Eight, Final Four, Championship Match, and National Champion.

Television
Select first and second-round games were broadcast on local networks (NET, Longhorn Network, OC Sports, Pac-12 Network, SEC+, and ESPN3). ESPN3 aired 7 of the 8 Regional semifinals, with ESPNU airing one (Nebraska/Washington). ESPNU aired all the Regional Finals, and ESPN2 had the National semifinals and finals. Below are the ESPN announcing assignments for Volleyball Tournament games.

Beth Mowins, Karch Kiraly (Ames), & Holly Rowe (Oklahoma City)
Melissa Lee & Missy Whittemore (Louisville)
Paul Sunderland & Maria Taylor (Minneapolis)
Sam Gore & Holly McPeak (Seattle)

References

NCAA Women's Volleyball Championship
 
Sports in Oklahoma
NCAA Division I women's volleyball tournament
Volleyball in Oklahoma
NCAA Division I women's volleyball tournament
Sports competitions in Oklahoma